Harry M. Jacoby  (died July 22, 1900) was a professional baseball player in the American Association for the 1882 and 1885 Baltimore Orioles.

External links

1900 deaths
Year of birth missing
Baltimore Orioles (AA) players
Major League Baseball second basemen
Major League Baseball third basemen
Major League Baseball outfielders
Baseball players from Pennsylvania
New York Quicksteps players
Reading Actives players
Allentown Dukes players
Norfolk (minor league baseball) players
Syracuse Stars (minor league baseball) players
Davenport (minor league baseball) players
Lebanon (minor league baseball) players
19th-century baseball players